The Phoenixville Historic District is a national historic district located at Phoenixville, Chester County, Pennsylvania.  The district consists of the older part of Phoenixville, especially the former Phoenix Iron Works site and its employee and owner housing.

At the time of nomination (c. 1987), the district contained 908 contributing building, 52 non-contributing buildings and one contributing structure (bridge). The district is "roughly bounded by Penn St., RR tracks, Fourth Ave., and Wheatland St."  This historic district is the largest in Chester County.

References

Historic districts on the National Register of Historic Places in Pennsylvania
Greek Revival architecture in Pennsylvania
Italianate architecture in Pennsylvania
Second Empire architecture in Pennsylvania
Historic districts in Chester County, Pennsylvania
National Register of Historic Places in Chester County, Pennsylvania